New Classical architecture, New Classicism or Contemporary Classical architecture is a contemporary movement in architecture that continues the practice of Classical architecture. It is sometimes considered the modern continuation of Neoclassical architecture, even though other styles might be cited as well, such as Gothic, Baroque, Renaissance or even non-Western styles – often referenced and recreated from a postmodern perspective as opposed to being strict revival styles.

The design and construction of buildings in ever-evolving classical styles continued throughout the 20th and 21st centuries, even as modernist and other non-classical theories broke with the classical language of architecture. The new classical movement is also connected to a surge in new traditional architecture, that is crafted according to local building traditions and materials.

Development 

In Britain during the 1950s and 1960s, a handful of architects continued to design buildings in a neoclassical style, contrary to the prevailing fashion for Modern architecture at the time.

Donald McMorran, who described the Modernist movement as "a dictatorship of taste", designed several noteworthy neoclassical buildings through his practice, McMorran & Whitby, including halls of residence at the University of Nottingham (1959) and an extension to the Old Bailey (1965), as well as numerous civic buildings and housing estates.

Another noted British architect, Raymond Erith, continued to design classical houses into the late 1960s and early 1970s. Quinlan Terry, a New Classical Architect who continues to practice, was an employee, later a partner and now the successor of the late Raymond Erith. French architect François Spoerry also continued to create classical designs from the 1960s onwards, later culminating in the European Urban Renaissance. In the late 1970s several young architects in Europe began challenging modernist proposals in architecture and planning. To broadcast them, Leon Krier and  founded the Archives d'Architecture Moderne in Brussels and began publishing texts and counterprojects to modernist proposals in architecture and planning. It received a boost from the sponsorship of Charles, Prince of Wales, especially with The Prince's Foundation for Building Community.

In these years, postmodern architecture developed a critique of modernist architectural aesthetics.  Among them were certain influential postmodernist architects such as Charles Moore, Robert Venturi, and Michael Graves,  who used classical elements as ironic motifs in order to criticize modernism's sterility. A broad spectrum of more than two dozen architects, theorists, and historians presented other alternatives to modernism. Among them were several serious New Classical architects who saw classicism as a legitimate mode of architectural expression, several of whom would later become Driehaus Prize Laureates, including some such as Thomas Beeby and Robert A.M. Stern, who practice both in postmodern as well as classical modes. Some postmodernist firms, such as Stern and Albert, Righter, & Tittman, fully moved from postmodern design to new interpretations of traditional architecture. Thomas Gordon Smith, the 1979 Rome Prize laureate from the American Academy in Rome, was a devotee of Charles Moore. In 1988, Smith published "Classical Architecture: Rule and Invention", and, in 1989, was appointed to chair of the University of Notre Dame Department of Architecture, now the School of Architecture, that specialized in teaching classical and traditional building practices. Today, other programs exist which teach in part New Classical Architecture at the University of Miami, Judson University, Andrews University and beginning in 2013,  the Center for Advanced Research in Traditional Architecture at the University of Colorado Denver.

Alongside these academic and scholarly developments, a populist and professional manifestation of new classicism has existed and continues to develop. The 1963 demolition of McKim, Mead & White's Pennsylvania Railroad Station in New York City provoked the formation of Classical America and its regional chapters, led by Henry Hope Reed, Jr.  Classical America advocated the appreciation of classically inspired buildings and for the practice of contemporary classical and traditional design by teaching architects to draw the classical orders, hosting walking tours, educational events, conferences and publishing The Classical America Series in Art and Architecture.

In 2002, the then-named Institute of Classical Architecture merged with Classical America to form the Institute of Classical Architecture & Classical America (now the Institute of Classical Architecture and Art). The ICAA currently supports and is supported by regional chapters across the United States, almost all of which host awards programs  which recognize significant accomplishments in new classical and traditional design and construction.  The ICAA publishes The Classicist, a peer-reviewed journal exclusively dedicated to the theory and practice of contemporary classicism in architecture, urbanism, and the allied arts.  The ICAA offers educational programs to architecture and design professionals, many of which follow the methodologies of the École des Beaux-Arts. The ICAA also teaches courses to educate the general public, and has created programs such as the Beaux Arts Atelier, the Advanced Program in Residential Design for the American Institute of Building Designers, and many other unique programs.

The international character of the New Classical movement was propelled by the creation in 2001 of the International Network for Traditional Building, Architecture & Urbanism (INTBAU), an international organization dedicated on supporting traditional building and the maintenance of local character. INTBAU spans more than 40 countries with its local chapters. This network was created under the patronage of Charles, Prince of Wales himself an important figure in the New Classical movement.

In 2003, Chicago philanthropist Richard H. Driehaus established a prize in architecture to be given to an architect "whose work embodies the principles of classical and traditional architecture and urbanism in society, and creates a positive, long lasting impact."  Awarded by the University of Notre Dame School of Architecture, the Driehaus Architecture Prize is seen as the alternative to the modernist Pritzker Prize. The Driehaus Prize is given in conjunction with the Reed Award, for an individual working outside the practice of architecture who has supported the cultivation of the traditional city, its architecture and art through writing, planning or promotion. Other high-profiled classical architecture awards are the US-American Palladio Award, the European , the Iberian Rafael Manzano Prize,  the Edmund N. Bacon Prize, and the Rieger Graham Prize  of the Institute of Classical Architecture and Art (ICAA) for architecture graduates.

Philosophy 

New Classical architecture is complementary architecture focused on a modus operandi that emphasizes the awareness of sustainability, the aim is to create long-lasting, well-crafted buildings of great quality, adapted to the context and with an efficient use of natural resources.

Educational institutions

While modernist teaching is the basis of architecture curricula in most universities around the world, some institutions focus solely, mainly or partly on teaching the principles of traditional and classical architecture and urban planning. Some of these are:

Brazil
 (UNIEURO), in Brasília.

India
Tirumala S.V. Institute of Traditional Sculpture and Architecture (SVITSA), in Tirupati, Andhra Pradesh.

Italy
 Polytechnic University of Bari, in Bari.

New Zealand
UNITEC Institute of Technology, in Auckland.

United Kingdom
National Design Academy, in Nottingham (heritage interior design).
The Prince's Foundation for Building Community, in London.
The Prince's School of Traditional Arts, in London.
Unit 6 of the Kingston School of Art's Master of Architecture program, the only postgraduate unit in the United Kingdom to teach classical design. Previously, this was taught in the undergraduate program.
University of Portsmouth, in Portsmouth, School of Architecture.
PRASADA – Practice, Research, and Advancement in South Asian Design and Architecture at Welsh School of Architecture, Cardiff University, in Cardiff, Wales.
 
United States
Andrews University, in Berrien Springs, Michigan. 
American College of the Building Arts. and School of the Arts at College of Charleston, in Charleston, South Carolina.
The Center for Advanced Research in Traditional Architecture at the University of Colorado, in Denver, Colorado.
University of Miami, in Coral Gables, Florida.
Yale School of Architecture, in New Haven, Connecticut.
Grand Central Academy of Art formerly hosted at the Institute of Classical Architecture & Art (ICAA), in New York City, New York.
Institute of Classical Architecture & Art (ICAA), in New York City, New York.
University of Notre Dame School of Architecture, in Notre Dame, Indiana.
Utah Valley University, in Orem, Utah.
Beaux-Arts Academy, in Salt Lake City, Utah.
Academy of Classical Design, in Southern Pines, North Carolina.

Examples

See also

New Urbanism
Complementary architecture
Revivalism (architecture)
Classical Realism
Driehaus Architecture Prize
Traditional architecture
Outline of classical architecture

References

Bibliography

External links

 
 Illustrated Glossary of Classical Architecture
 Institute of Classical Architecture and Art
 Traditional Architecture Group
  INTBAU - Universities / institutions offering traditional architecture courses by country
 OpenSource Classicism - project for free educational content about (new) classical architecture
 The architectural traditions are back – we should celebrate, The Spectator, Hugh Pearman, 28 October 2017

Examples
 Neohistorism Photo Group - New Classic Architecture

 
 
 
Revival architectural styles
20th-century architectural styles
21st-century architectural styles